Langenhorn is a municipality in the district of Nordfriesland in Schleswig-Holstein, Germany.

Notable persons

 Friedrich Paulsen, (1846–1908) philosopher and educator. A Memorial to Paulsen was placed in St. Lawrence Church with a commemoration ceremony on 16 September 2012; a marketplace in the West-Langenhorn district was renamed Friedrich-Paulsen-Platz.

References

Nordfriesland